PTT Public Company Limited or simply PTT is a Thai state-owned SET-listed oil and gas company. Formerly known as the Petroleum Authority of Thailand, it owns extensive submarine gas pipelines in the Gulf of Thailand, a network of LPG terminals throughout the kingdom, and it is involved in electricity generation, petrochemical products, oil and gas exploration and production, and gasoline retailing businesses. The company also owns Café Amazon, a popular coffee chain throughout South East Asia, which shops are often located next to PTT gas stations or inside malls.

Affiliated companies include PTT Exploration and Production, PTT Global Chemical, PTT Asia Pacific Mining, and PTT Green Energy.

On 15 December 2022, the world's largest institutional investor the Norwegian Government Pension Fund Global divested from PTT and its subsidiary PTT Oil and Retail Business PCL (PTTOR) due to "unacceptable risk that the companies contribute to serious violations of individuals’ rights in situations of war or conflict".

History
PTT is the largest corporation in the country and also the only company from Thailand listed in Fortune Global 500 companies. The company ranks 81st among top 500 on the Fortune 500, and 180 on the Forbes 2000. PTT was founded in 1978 (as Petroleum Authority of Thailand) as a state-owned enterprise, under Prime Minister Kriangsak Chamanan's government. It was formed by a coupling between Thai Fuel Organization (Thai: องค์การเชื้อเพลิง) under Defense Energy Department and Thai Natural Gas Organization (Thai:  องค์การก๊าซธรรมชาติแห่งประเทศไทย) under Ministry of Industry.

Financials
For 2016 PTT PCL reported revenues of 1,737,148 million baht, net income of 94,609 million baht, assets of 2,232,331 million baht, and total equity of 762,948 million baht.

PTT's 15 directors were compensated with 14.9 million baht in meeting allowances in 2016, plus 38.7 million baht in bonuses. The president and CEO's salary for the year was 30.6 million baht plus a 9.6 million baht bonus. The company in 2016 employed 4,616 (PTT) and 24,680 at subsidiaries. Total compensation for PTT employees in 2016, excluding top management, was 9,651 million baht.

Operations 

In 2012, PTT purchased the remaining 55 percent of Sakari Resources, a Singaporean coal mine operator.

In 2012, PTT Exploration and Production (PTTEP) took over Cove Energy plc, which owned an 8.5 percent share in a huge natural-gas field offshore Mozambique.

The company operates 58 retail stations in the Philippines and plans to add an additional 15-20 petrol stations in Luzon and the Visayas, in Cebu Province.

PTT Public Company Limited and Pertamina, Indonesia's state-owned oil company, partnered to build a new petrochemical complex in Indonesia for an estimated cost of US$4–5 billion.

Vencorex
Vencorex is a joint venture between PTT Global Chemical and the Perstorp Group, created in 2012, based in France's Rhône-Alpes region. It is the owner of technology and a major manufacturer of isocyanates, particularly toluene diisocyanate (TDI), hexamethylene diisocyanate (HDI, IPDI) and its derivatives.

Oil spills
The 2009 Montara oil spill,  250 km off Australia's northwestern coast led to "Thousands of barrels of oil gushed into the ocean over a 10-week period following a blowout at PTTEP Australasia's West Atlas rig in the Timor Sea". The Australian unit of PTT Exploration and Production (PTTEP) "admitted to four charges" in the 2009 spill.

The 2013 Rayong oil spill started on the night of 28 July 2013. An oil leak (from a pipeline) 35 kilometers from Ko Samet's Ao Phrao Beach, resulted in the beach being closed and its tourists evacuated after spillage reached the beach. The crude oil spill had occurred 20 km off Thailand's mainland, "when a floating hose transferring oil from a tanker to a PTT refinery pipeline broke sending 50,000 litres of oil spewing into the coastal waters". On 7 August 2013 media said that the Department of Special Investigation had seized an oil supply line, suspected of being faulty.

Green energy
In November 1993 former Prime Minister of Thailand Anand Panyarachun established the Thailand Business Council for Sustainable Development.  In 2010, PTT President and CEO Prasert Bunsumpun announced that PTT would expand into producing more renewable energy.

PTT has many subsidiaries, including PTTGC, TOP, BCP, and PTTEP, all of which are working towards producing more environmentally friendly energy. In 2014, Bangchak Petroleum completed its Sunny Bangchak project, a 38-megawatt silicon photovoltaic power plant, the largest of its kind in Southeast Asia. In September 2014, Thai Oil Public Company Limited (TOP), another PTT subsidiary, was recognized as a leader in business sustainability by the Dow Jones Sustainability Index. Thai Oil (TOP) has proven to be an environmentally friendly company, with no reported violations of environmental laws.

The company also produces and distributes ethanol from sugarcane through various channels like Maesod Clean Energy, Sapthip, and Ubon Bio Ethanol. In August 2014, PTT Global Chemical (PTTGC) along with Diary Home and NatureWorks, announced their eco-friendly Ingeo bioplastics yoghurt cup. PTTGC seeks to become a major player in bio-based chemicals.

Rolls-Royce bribery case
In an action by the US Department of Justice (DOJ) against aircraft engine-maker Rolls-Royce, the DOJ claimed that Rolls-Royce had paid more than US$11 million in commissions to win a deal with Thai Airways, aware that some of the funds would be used to bribe officials at PTT and its subsidiary, PTT Exploration and Production (PTTEP). The payments were made from 2003-2013 and related to contracts for equipment and after-market products and services. Admitting its guilt, Rolls-Royce paid US$170 million to settle the case. PTT vowed to investigate. Subsequently, PTT Chairman and CEO Tevin Vongvanich said that the company was unable to find anyone who "allegedly took bribes".

See also

References

External links
 PTT Public Company Limited
 A History of the Petroleum Oil Industry in Thailand from 1946 to 1978
 PTT Public Company Limited have always offered the lowest consumers price per liter in Thailand
 PTT Blue Card for consumers offering discounts and vouchers

1978 establishments in Thailand
Automotive fuel retailers
Chemical companies of Thailand
Companies based in Bangkok
Companies listed on the Stock Exchange of Thailand
Energy companies established in 1978
Government-owned companies of Thailand
Non-renewable resource companies established in 1978
Oil and gas companies of Thailand
PTT group
Thai brands